Simon Werro (born 9 December 1989) is a Swiss slalom canoeist who has competed since 2010. Together with his younger brother Lukas he placed ninth in the slalom doubles (C2) event at the 2016 Summer Olympics in Rio de Janeiro.

References

External links
 

1989 births
Living people
Canoeists at the 2016 Summer Olympics
Olympic canoeists of Switzerland
Swiss male canoeists